The Oporto Open (aka Maia Open) is a defunct ATP Tour affiliated men's tennis tournament played from 1995 to 1996. It was held in Maia in Portugal and was played on outdoor clay courts.

Results

Singles

Doubles

External links
 ATP Results Archive

 
Defunct tennis tournaments in Europe
Recurring sporting events established in 1995
Recurring sporting events disestablished in 1996
1995 establishments in Portugal
1996 disestablishments in Portugal
Defunct sports competitions in Portugal